Excelsior-Henderson Motorcycle was a motorcycle manufacturing company located in Belle Plaine, Minnesota in the late 1990s.

History
The company was originally founded as Hanlon Manufacturing Company by Daniel Hanlon during early 1993 in Burnsville, Minnesota, United States.  The company secured the rights of motorcycle names previously used by the former Excelsior-Henderson company, that was owned by Ignatz Schwinn of the Schwinn company. The company proceeded to design and manufacture OEM proprietary motorcycles with design originality of the former Excelsior and Henderson motorcycles.

Factory
From 1997 to 1998, the company constructed a factory in Belle Plaine, Minnesota. The factory was equipped for a capacity of 10,000 motorcycles per year, and, with a few minor assembly and finishing line changes, would have had a capacity of 20,000.  In 2009, the factory was converted to the headquarters of Cambria, a company specializing in quartz surfaces.

Production
Excelsior-Henderson introduced it first production model, the Super X, in December 1998, and commenced production in early 1999. The company developed the Super X motorcycle as a new proprietary motorcycle, including a new engine, frame, and all related drive and styling components, adopting  styling from the earlier Excelsior-Henderson motorcycles from the 1905-1931 timeframe. The company established 140 dealers throughout the United States. The motorcycles averaged an MSRP around $18,500. Via the assembly line, the company produced for retail sale approx. 1900 motorcycles in various configurations; 1161 units in model year 1999, and 720 units in model year 2000. In total, the company produced an estimated 1950 motorcycles, which would include motorcycles produced and not designed for retail dealer sales; such as dealer promotional bikes, test prototypes and non-assembly line produced motorcycles.

Chapter 11 Bankruptcy
Excelsior-Henderson, having spent $100 million in capital over a seven year period and still several years from profitability, was unable to raise additional capital by late 1999.  Therefore, on December 21, 1999, Excelsior-Henderson filed for reorganization under Chapter 11, Title 11, United States Code. As an outcome of the process, certain assets of the company were sold to a Florida investment group, which later filed for reorganization and no longer exists. Production of motorcycles never recommenced. According to former employees, the company’s failures can be attributed to ineptitude in growing a dealer network, micromanaging, and an unwillingness to accept and incorporate suggestion.  Gary Fields, Deputy Commissioner of Minnesota’s Department of Trade and Economic Development, said that the state would be less likely to fund another startup based on the failures of Excelsior-Henderson.

Current Status
On 16 December 2020, Cycle World reported Excelsior-Henderson's intellectual property had been purchased by Bajaj, a major manufacturer of motorcycles in India.

References

  MOTOS EN CUBA - LAS MOTOS DE LA INDEPENDENCIA (1885-1940).
  Retrospective: 1999-2000 Excelsior-Henderson Super X.
  History of Motorcycles in Cuba.

External links

Defunct motorcycle manufacturers of the United States
Motor vehicle manufacturers based in Minnesota
Burnsville, Minnesota
Vehicle manufacturing companies established in 1993
1993 establishments in Minnesota